Dangi may refer to

Dangi people, a  Hindu farming caste native to northern India
Dangi, Iran (disambiguation)
Dangi language (disambiguation)

People with the surname

Anand Singh Dangi, Indian politician, a member of the Haryana Legislative Assembly
Chandra Bahadur Dangi (1939–2015), world's shortest verified person
Dalichand Dangi, Indian politician, member of the Rajasthan Legislative Assembly
Indira Dangi (born 1980), Indian novelist
Purshottam Dangi, Indian politician, member of the Madhya Pradesh Legislative Assembly

See also

Dhangi, Indian name for a ship